In baseball, a run batted in (RBI) is awarded to a batter for each runner who scores as a result of the batter's action, including a hit, fielder's choice, sacrifice fly, bases loaded walk, or hit by pitch. A batter is also awarded an RBI for scoring himself upon hitting a home run. 

In Major League Baseball (MLB), a player in each league wins the "RBI crown" or "RBI title" each season by hitting the most runs batted in that year. The first RBI champion in the National League (NL) was Deacon White; in the league's inaugural 1876 season, White hit 60 RBIs for the Chicago White Stockings. The American League (AL) was established in 1901, and Hall of Fame second baseman Nap Lajoie led that league with 125 RBIs for the Philadelphia Athletics. Over the course of his 27-season career, Cap Anson led the NL in RBI eight times. Babe Ruth and Honus Wagner have the second- and third-most RBI titles, respectively: Ruth with six, and Wagner with five. Several players are tied for the most consecutive seasons led with three: Anson (twice), Ty Cobb, Rogers Hornsby, Ruth, Joe Medwick, George Foster, and Cecil Fielder. Notably, Matt Holliday won the NL title in 2007 by one RBI over Ryan Howard, only overtaking Howard due to his performance in the 2007 National League Wild Card tie-breaker game. Had Howard won the 2007 title, he would have led the NL in a record four consecutive seasons from 2006 to 2009. The most recent champions are Salvador Perez in the American League, and Adam Duvall in the National League.

Sam Thompson was the first to set a single-season RBI record that stood for more than three seasons, hitting 166 in 1887. Thompson's title that season also represented the widest margin of victory for an RBI champion as he topped the next highest total by 62 RBIs. The single-season mark of 166 stood for over thirty years until Babe Ruth hit 171 in 1921. Ruth's mark was then broken by teammate Lou Gehrig six seasons later in 1927 when Gehrig hit 175 RBI. Finally, Hack Wilson set the current record mark of 191 RBI in 1930 with the Chicago Cubs. The all-time career RBI record holder is Hank Aaron with 2,297, 84 more than Ruth in second place. Aaron led the National League in RBI four times, never consecutively. The 1930 season when Wilson set the record saw four players hit more than 160 RBI: Wilson, Gehrig, Chuck Klein, and Al Simmons. A player has batted in 160 or more runs 21 times, with 14 of these seasons occurring during the 1930s and only twice since 1940. The lowest RBI total to ever lead a major league was 49, by Deacon White in the National League's second season.

Key

American League

National League

Other major leagues

Footnotes
Recognized "major leagues" include the current American and National Leagues and several defunct leagues – the American Association, the Federal League, the Players' League, and the Union Association. However, RBI statistics are not available for the Union Association.

References

General

Specific

Runs batted in champions
Runs batted in champions
Runs batted in